Together We're Heavy is the second release from Dallas symphonic rock group The Polyphonic Spree. Produced by Eric Drew Feldman and released in Japan on June 30, 2004, Europe on July 12 and North America on July 13. It includes the hit singles "Hold Me Now" and "Two Thousand Places". The album was released by Hollywood Records, and represents the band's first "true" album (their previous release, The Beginning Stages of..., was recorded as a demo and released only by popular demand).

The US version of Together We're Heavy contains an additional bonus DVD (entitled "The Adventure of Listening") while the Japanese version contains three bonus songs.

It reached number one on the Billboard Top Heatseekers albums chart in the United States.

Track listing
All songs written by Tim DeLaughter.
"Section 11 (A Long Day Continues/We Sound Amazed)" – 8:32
"Section 12 (Hold Me Now)" – 4:30
"Section 13 (Diamonds/Mild Devotion to Majesty)" – 4:55
"Section 14 (Two Thousand Places)" – 5:19
"Section 15 (Ensure Your Reservation)" – 1:39
"Section 16 (One Man Show)" – 4:58
"Section 17 (Suitcase Calling)" – 8:48
"Section 18 (Everything Starts at the Seam)" – 1:54
"Section 19 (When the Fool Becomes a King)" – 10:38
"Section 20 (Together We're Heavy)" – 6:30

"Bonus Section 1 (The Best Part)" (Japanese release only)
"Bonus Section 2 (Mercury Tea)" (Japanese release only)
"Bonus Section 3 (Working Out the Kinks [Demo 2002])" (Japanese release only)

"The Adventure of Listening" DVD:

"A Blissed Out Occasion" – Live at the Summersonic Festival, Tokyo, 2003
Contains "The Anthem for Summer Camp", "It's the Sun", "Light & Day", "Everything Starts at the Seam" and "When the Fool Becomes a King"
"Air Near the Ground" – Live at the Cabaret Metro, Chicago, 2003
Contains "Soldier Girl", "Hanging Around the Day (Parts 1 & 2)" and "It's the Sun"
"Confessions of an Instigator" – An interview with Tim DeLaughter
"Moving Pictures"
Contains the music video for "Light & Day (Single Version)", the animated video for "Light & Day (Orchestral Version)" and "The Tramp (A Vignette)" (previously titled "Cane" and played to the song "Ensure Your Reservation")

Singles
"Hold Me Now" CD single (July 26, 2004)
"Hold Me Now" (Radio Edit – UK Edit)
"Hold Me Now" (Album Version)
"Working Out the Kinks" (Demo)
"Two Thousand Places" CD single (December 8, 2004)
"Two Thousand Places"
"The Best Part"
"Happy Xmas (War Is Over)"

Personnel
Adapted from AllMusic.

Musicians
Tim DeLaughter: Lead vocals, guitars, percussion, tubular bells, piano, organ, samples, various noises
Ryan Fitzgerald: Acoustic and electric guitars, banjo
Joe Butcher: Pedal steel
Evan Hisey: Keyboards, organ, synthesizers
Jesse Hester: Piano, vocals
Mark Pirro: Bass guitar
Rick Nelson: Double bass, violin, viola
Bryan Wakeland: Drums, percussion
Audrey Easley: Flute, piccolo, tin whistle, Electronic Wind Instruments
Louis Schwadron: French horn
Toby Halbrooks: Theremin
James Reimer: Trombone, glockenspiel
Logan Keese: Trumpet, flugelhorn
Jennifer Jobe, Jennie Kelley, Jessica Jordan, Julie Duncanville, Kelly Repka, Michael Turner: Lead, backing and choir vocals

Production
Produced by Eric Drew Feldman, Jeff Levison and The Speekers
Recorded and engineered by Andrew Paul Baker, Ronnie Katz, Allen Sides, The Speekers and Dave Willingham
Assistant engineers: Chris Bell, Joel Pelphrey, Darrell Thorp
Mixed by Rich Costey, The Speekers and Dave Willingham
Mix assistant: Claudius Mittendorfer
Digital editing: Rail Jon Rogut
Mastered by Mark Chalecki and Ted Jensen

Charts

Release history
CD
UK release (July 12, 2004)
US release (July 13, 2004)
Japanese release (June 30, 2004)

DVD-Audio 5.1 Surround + DTS-Encoded track
US release (September 14, 2004)

References

The Polyphonic Spree albums
2004 albums
Hollywood Records albums
Good Records albums